Magstadt is a town in the German Federal state of Baden-Württemberg, in the district (Landkreis) Böblingen. It is located between Renningen and Sindelfingen.

References

Böblingen (district)
Württemberg